Ruckersville or Ruckerville may refer to:

Ruckersville, Georgia
Ruckerville, Kentucky
Ruckersville, Virginia